Italian names in the solar system

Moons

The Moon 
 Abetti (crater)
 Dante (crater)

Ganymede 
 Galileo Regio

Titan 
 Elba Facula
 Genova Sinus
 Mezzoramia (Titan)

Ariel 
 Befana crater

Venus 
 Agnesi (crater)
 Bassi crater
 Caccini crater
 Cortese crater
 d'Este crater
 Deledda crater

Mars 
 Cagli crater
 Cefalù
 Crotone	
 Herculaneum
 Locana
 Mistretta
 Nardo
 Neive
 Novara
 Pompeii
 Sarno

Ceres 
 Piazzi, a dark region southwest of Dantu crater

Asteroids 
 472 Roma
 477 Italia
 487 Venetia
 2999 Dante
 7794 Sanvito
 16765 Agnesi

Ida and Dactyl 
 Azzurra crater
 Castellana crater
 Stiffe crater

External links 
 Italiani nel sistema solare,  Michele T. Mazzucato, 2008, Nature

Space program of Italy
Astronomical nomenclature by nation